Silenzio... si nasce is a 1996 Italian comedy film directed by Giovanni Veronesi.

Cast
Sergio Castellitto
Paolo Rossi
Filippa Lagerbäck
Ermanno Veglietti

References

External links

1996 films
Films directed by Giovanni Veronesi
Italian comedy films
1990s Italian-language films
1990s Italian films